Balanophora fungosa, sometimes known as fungus root is a flowering plant in the family Balanophoraceae and occurs in South Asia, Southeast Asia, Australia and some Pacific Islands. It is an obligate parasite growing on the roots of rainforest trees. The flowering structure is shaped like a puffball but in fact consists of a globe covered with thousands of tiny female flowers. The globe is surrounded at its base by a much smaller number of male flowers. In flower, the plant emits an odour resembling that of mice.

Description
Like other members of its genus, B. fungosa is holoparasitic and contains no chlorophyll. The aerial parts of the plant consist of a hard, irregularly shaped tuber from which the flower-bearing structures extend.

The plant is monoecious or dioecious. When monoecious, it bears both pistillate (female) and staminate (male) flowers. Thousands of minute female flowers cover a globe-shaped structure  in diameter.

Taxonomy and naming
Balanophora fungosa was described by Johann Reinhold Forster and Georg Forster in 1774 and the description was published in Characteres Generum Plantarum. The species epithet fungosa is the adjectival form of the Latin word fungosus meaning "fungus-like", which refers to the plant's superficial resemblance to a mushroom.

The names of two subspecies are accepted by the Australian Plant Census:
 Balanophora fungosa J.R.Forst. & G.Forst. subsp. fungosa;
 Balanophora fungosa subsp. indica  (Arn.) B.Hansen.

Balanophora fungosa subsp. fungosa is monoecious, while subspecies indica is dioecious.

Distribution and habitat
In Australia it occurs in Queensland from near the border with New South Wales to Cape York.

Ecology
Twelve species of plant in eight families are known to be hosts to Balanophora fungosa var. indica including some of those in the genera Syzygium, Olea and Rapanea. The plant is sometimes a weed in coffee and tea plantations.

Numerous small animals visit the flowers, including ants, springtails, flies, a moth of the family noctuidae, and even rats, which appear to be attracted by the smell. Workers of the Asiatic honeybee, Apis cerana have been observed collecting pollen. Two beetle species of the genus Lasiodactylus, a moth of the family Pyralidae and a moth of the family Tipulidae use the bracts at the base of the flowers as a breeding site.

Use as medicine
Some cultures, such as the Paliar people of Tamil Nadu, use B. fungosa to treat medical conditions.

References 

fungosa
Flora of Queensland
Plants described in 1774
Taxa named by Johann Reinhold Forster